Sordaria macrospora is a species of coprophilous (dung-colonizing) fungus. It is one of several fungal model organisms in biology, e.g. the model of fruiting body development in Ascomycetes. It is a homothallic, self-fertile organism.

References

Sordariales